Capaz de Todo Por Ti (Eng.: Capable of Anything for You) is the fifth studio album by Mexican Duranguense band K-Paz de la Sierra. It was released on November 20, 2007. The album became their second number-one set on the Billboard Top Latin Albums. It is also noted as the band's last album with founder and original lead vocalist Sergio Gómez.

Track listing
The information from Billboard.

Chart performance

References

2007 albums
K-Paz de la Sierra albums
Spanish-language albums
Disa Records albums